New Year's Eve is a 1924 German silent Kammerspielfilm directed by Lupu Pick and written by Carl Mayer. It was filmed in 1923 and premiered in Berlin on 4 January 1924. The film is known to be one of the earliest examples of a kammerspielfilm and was innovative in its extensive use of "entfesselte Kamera", using tracking and gliding techniques as opposed to keeping the camera stationary. Like Pick's previous films, New Year's Eve does not use intertitles.

Plot 
A man is celebrating New Year's Eve with his wife and his mother, who are at odds with one another. As the evening progresses, the rivalry between the two women increases to an open hatred that eventually escalates into a big fight. The man assumes no position in favor of either woman and instead chooses to flee from the conflict.

Cast 
 Eugen Klöpfer as Der Mann
 Edith Posca as Die Frau
 Frida Richard as Die Mutter
 Karl Harbacher
 Julius E. Herrmann
 Rudolf Blümner

External links

References 

1924 films
German black-and-white films
Films directed by Lupu Pick
Films of the Weimar Republic
Films set in Germany
German Expressionist films
German silent feature films
Films with screenplays by Carl Mayer
UFA GmbH films